The 1992 World Junior Curling Championships were held from March 7 to 15 in Oberstdorf, Germany.

In was first-ever appearance at the championship for men's and women's national junior teams of Japan.

Men

Teams

Round Robin

(«W» — technical win; «L» — technical loss)

Playoffs

Rankings

Women

Teams

Round Robin

Tiebreaker

Playoffs

Rankings

Awards

WJCC All-Star Team:

WJCC Sportsmanship Award:

Sources

J
1992 in German sport
World Junior Curling Championships
Sports competitions in Oberstdorf
International curling competitions hosted by Germany
March 1992 sports events in Europe
1992 in youth sport
1990s in Bavaria